The 2012 Aegon Championships (also known traditionally as the Queen's Club Championships) was a men's tennis tournament played on outdoor grass courts. It was the 110th edition of the Queen's Club Championships and was part of the ATP World Tour 250 series of the 2012 ATP World Tour. It took place at the Queen's Club in London, United Kingdom, in the club's 126th year between 11 and 17 June.

Marin Čilić won the tournament after his opponent in the final, David Nalbandian was disqualified for kicking a lines official.

Singles main draw entrants

Seeds

 1 Seedings are based on the rankings of May 28, 2012

Other entrants
The following players received wildcards into the singles main draw:
  Jamie Baker
  Liam Broady
  Oliver Golding
  Lleyton Hewitt
  James Ward

The following players received entry from the qualifying draw:
  Ruben Bemelmans
  Kenny de Schepper
  Evgeny Korolev
  Bobby Reynolds

The following player received a Lucky Loser spot:
  Ryan Sweeting

Withdrawals
  Juan Martín del Potro
  Alejandro Falla
  Mardy Fish
  Richard Gasquet
  Leonardo Mayer
  Stanislas Wawrinka

Doubles main draw entrants

Seeds

 Rankings are as of May 28, 2012

Other entrants
The following pairs received wildcards into the doubles main draw:
  Jamie Delgado /  Ken Skupski
  Lleyton Hewitt /  Andy Roddick
The following pair received entry as alternates:
  Steve Darcis /  Olivier Rochus

Withdrawals
  Leonardo Mayer (family emergency)

Finals

Singles

 Marin Čilić defeated  David Nalbandian 6–7(3–7), 4–3 def.

Doubles

 Max Mirnyi /  Daniel Nestor defeated  Bob Bryan /  Mike Bryan, 6–3, 6–4

References

External links

 Official website
 ATP tournament profile

 
Aegon Championships
Queen's Club Championships
Aegon Championships
Aegon Championships
Aegon Championships